Following the October Revolution, Vladimir Lenin became the head of the new government of the Russian Soviet Federative Socialist Republic. It was known officially as the Council of People's Commissars, effectively his cabinet. Ten of the council's fourteen members would later be killed during Joseph Stalin's Great Purge.

Council of People's Commissars
The Council of People's Commissars of the RSFSR was the governmental cabinet of the Russian Soviet Federative Socialist Republic (RSFSR) from 1917 through 1946. That year it was renamed the Council of Ministers of the RSFSR. Following the Declaration of the Creation of the USSR in 1922, state powers of this institution of the RSFSR were somewhat superseded by the Council of People's Commissars of the USSR.

By September 1917, the councils (soviets) of workers, peasants and soldiers acquired considerable political and military power. The leaders of the Petrograd Soviet conspired to overthrow the Russian Provisional Government; the uprising started on 7 November 1917, when Red Guards units captured the Winter Palace. On the next day, 8 November 1917, the Second All-Russian Congress of Soviets recognized the success of the uprising, and formally established the new government, reflecting the capture of the soviets by the Bolsheviks.

The government was formally called the Council of People's Commissars (Совет народных коммиссаров), abbreviated as Sovnarkom (Совнарком). Leon Trotsky devised the council and commissar names, thereby avoiding the more "bourgeois" terms of minister and cabinet.

The People's Commissars (translit.: Narodny komissar, or Narkom) functioned as government ministers. A ministry was called a People's Commissariat (translit.: Narodny komissariat, abbreviated to narkomat).

Formation
Traditionally, the executive part of a government is directed by a council of ministers nominated by a ruler or by a president. The Bolsheviks considered this to be a bourgeois institution, and wanted to create what they believed was a new government made up of a 'soviet' of workers and peasants. 

The role and structure of the Sovnarkom was formalized in the 1918 Constitution of the RSFSR. The Sovnarkom of the RSFSR was responsible to the Congress of Soviets for the "general administration of the affairs of the state".  The constitution enabled the Sovnarkom to issue decrees carrying the full force of law when the Congress was not in session.  The Congress would routinely approve these decrees at its next session.

Each People's Commissar was head of commissariat and had several deputies and a colleguium, which functioned as a deliberative body to advise the commissar.

The Chairman of the Council of People's Commissars, also elected by the Congress, had a function similar to that of a prime minister. The first Chairman of the Sovnarkom was Vladimir Lenin.

First People's Commissars
The first council elected by the Second All-Russian congress was composed by the following 14 members. Eight of the men were executed and one died in prison during the late 1930s, the time of terrorism and the Great Purge by Joseph Stalin, then General Secretary of the Communist Party and leader of the USSR. Trotsky was assassinated in Mexico in 1940 as part of his destruction of opposition.

References

External links
The Consul General at Moscow (Summers) to the Secretary of State, Yale University
The decree of the Council of the People's Commissars on the ...

Government
Government
1917 establishments in Russia
Russian Soviet Federative Socialist Republic